Endelomyia is a genus of common sawflies in the family Tenthredinidae. There are at least two described species in Endelomyia.

Species
These two species belong to the genus Endelomyia:
 Endelomyia aethiops (Fabricius) i c g b (roseslug)
 Endelomyia filipendulae Lacourt, 1998 g
Data sources: i = ITIS, c = Catalogue of Life, g = GBIF, b = Bugguide.net

References

Further reading

External links

 

Tenthredinidae
Articles created by Qbugbot